Pyar Ka Karz  is a 1990 Indian Hindi-language film directed by K. Bapaiah, starring Dharmendra, Mithun Chakraborty.

Plot
Pyar Ka Karz is a usual action film for Dharmendra and Mithun fans.

Cast
Dharmendra as Shekhar "Shaka"
Mithun Chakraborty as 	Ravi Shankar
Meenakshi Seshadri as Dr. Naina
Neelam as Seema 
Sonam as Mona
Vinod Mehra as Police Commissioner Arun Kumar
Kader Khan as Constable / Sub-Inspector Nakedar Subedar Thandedar Sapotdar
Aruna Irani as Indumati Sapotdar
Shakti Kapoor as Lal
Raza Murad as Rajpal
Asrani as Constable Lapetkar
Rajendranath as Doctor
Vikram Gokhale as Mr. Sanyal
Viju Khote as Sub-Inspector Naik
Vikas Anand as DIG

Music
Anand Bakshi wrote the songs.

"Naina Tere Naino Ki" (Part 1) - Amit Kumar
"Ek Saal Chalega Apna Honeymoon" - Sudesh Bhosle, Alka Yagnik
"Sabse Pehla Yeh Kaam Kiya" - Kavita Krishnamurthy, Amit Kumar
"Laagi Nahin Chhute Rama" - Anuradha Paudwal, Sudesh Bhosle
"I Love You, Ye Jo Aag Lagi Hai Dil Me" - Sudesh Bhosle, Anuradha Paudwal
"Naina Tere Naino Ki" (Part 2) - Amit Kumar

References

External links
 

1990 films
1990s Hindi-language films
Films directed by K. Bapayya
Films scored by Laxmikant–Pyarelal